Vera Carmi (23 November 1914 – 6 September 1969) was an Italian film actress. She appeared in more than 50 films between 1940 and 1956. She was born in Turin, Italy and died in Rome, Italy.

Life and career
Carmi was born Virginia Doglioli in Turin.  After being spotted by the director  Ferdinando Maria Poggioli in a beauty contest, she  made her film debut in 1940, in a supporting role in Poggioli's Goodbye Youth and in a short time she became one of the most requested actresses in the Telefoni Bianchi genre. 

After the war she got critical acclaim for a number of dramatic performances, notably Mario Soldati's His Young Wife and Luciano Emmer's Sunday in August. She was also very active on stage. Gradually cast in less important roles, she eventually retired in the second half of the 1950s.

Carmi was the first wife of the football player Aldo Giuseppe Borel.

Partial filmography
 

 Goodbye Youth (1940) - La fidanzata di Giovanni
 A Husband for the Month of April (1941) - La fioraia
 Il cavaliere senza nome (1941) - Bianca
 Villa da vendere (1941) - Lidia
 L'amore canta (1941) - Marta Della Rocca
 La fortuna viene dal cielo (1942) - Anna Illes
 Una volta alla settimana (1942) - Laura Macrè - sua fanciulla
 Labbra serrate (1942) - Anna Massani
 Happy Days (1942) - Nietta
 Redemption (1943) - Maria
 Two Hearts Among the Beasts (1943) - Laura Berti
 Lively Teresa (1943) - Luisa, la manicure
 Il fidanzato di mia moglie (1943) - Renata Sarti
 La signora in nero (1943) - Bianca Maria De Ritis
 Anything for a Song (1943) - La fanciulla
 The Za-Bum Circus (1944) - (segment "Galop finale al circo")
 Finalmente sì (1944) - Silvia
 The Ten Commandments (1945) - (segment "Onora il padre e la madre")
 His Young Wife (1945) - Madama Rosa Travet
 07... Tassì (1945) - L'attrice
 O sole mio (1946) - Clara, la spia
 The Models of Margutta (1946) - Paola
 Tempesta d'anime (1946)
 Trepidazione (1946)
 Christmas at Camp 119 (1947) - La maestrina torinese
 Farewell, My Beautiful Naples (1947) - Roberta Sullivan
 Sono io l'assassino (1948)
 Cab Number 13 (1948) - Jeanne Herblet (segments "Delitto" & "Castigo")
 L'isola di Montecristo (1948) - Elena Fabbri
 How I Lost the War (1948) - Gemma
 Sunday in August (1950) - Adriana
 The Two Sisters (1950) - Franca
 Milano miliardaria (1951) - Paola
 My Heart Sings (1951) - Madre di Enrico
 Black Feathers (1952) - Catina Cossutti
 The Blind Woman of Sorrento (1953) - Elena Viscardi
 Die Tochter der Kompanie (1953)
 Buon viaggio pover'uomo (1953) - Teresa
 I Always Loved You (1953) - Sister Anna
 The Daughter of the Regiment (1953) - moglie di Carlo
 Matrimonial Agency (1953) - Luisa
 It Takes Two to Sin in Love (1954) - Bianca Giorgi
 Appassionatamente (1954) - Paola
 Concert of Intrigue (1954) - Capo infermiere
 Ho pianto per te! (1954)
 Trieste cantico d'amore (1954) - Anna di Sant'Elmo
 Amici per la pelle (1955) - La madre di Mario
 La ladra (1955) - Signora Barenghi
 Revelation (1955) - Elena Ulianova, sorella di Nadia
 Mai ti scorderò (1956) - La padrona della trattoria
 I miliardari (1956) - Segretaria di Ferri

References

External links

1914 births
1969 deaths
Italian film actresses
20th-century Italian actresses
Actors from Turin
Italian stage actresses
Association footballers' wives and girlfriends